Cheadle and Gatley was, from 1894 to 1974, an urban district of Cheshire, England.

It was created by the Local Government Act 1894 based on the Cheadle and Gatley urban sanitary district.  It was abolished under the Local Government Act 1972 and now forms part of the Metropolitan Borough of Stockport in Greater Manchester.

The Cheadle and Gatley Urban District covered a much larger area than the current Cheadle and Gatley ward, including not only Cheadle and Gatley but also Cheadle Hulme and Heald Green (approximately the current SK8 postcode area). It used Bruntwood Hall as its town hall from 1944 to 1959, and Abney Hall from 1960 to 1974.

References

2 Bowden, Tom.  Community and Change. Manchester: E. J. Morten, 1974.

External links
 Cheadle and Gatley

Districts of England created by the Local Government Act 1894
Districts of England abolished by the Local Government Act 1972
Local government in the Metropolitan Borough of Stockport
History of Cheshire
History of the Metropolitan Borough of Stockport
Urban districts of England
Cheadle, Greater Manchester
Cheadle Hulme